Rocket Power is an American animated television series created by Arlene Klasky and Gábor Csupó, the creators of Rugrats. The series aired on Nickelodeon from August 16, 1999, to July 30, 2004.

Premise
Rocket Power revolves around the day-to-day adventures of a gang of four young and loyal friends; the adventurous and vain sports enthusiast and perfectionist: Oswald "Otto" Rocket; his tomboyish and kind-hearted older sister: Regina "Reggie" Rocket; Otto's dim-witted but loyal best friend and videographer: Maurice "Twister" Rodriguez; and the brainy techno whiz kid and relative newcomer: Sam "Squid" Dullard — who live in the fictional Southern California beach community of Ocean Shores, where they spend their free time playing varied extreme sports (such as Skateboarding, Surfing, Snowboarding, Biking, Street Hockey, etc.), getting into various situations and overcoming the trials and challenges of growing up.

Otto and Reggie live with their widowed strict but loving father and veteran surfer, Ray "Raymundo" Rocket, who along with his best friend and business partner, Tito Makani, owns and operates the Shore Shack, a combination burger joint and surf shop where the gang usually hang out. In most episodes, they get involved in competitions, but end up learning their friendship is more important than winning.

Characters

Main Characters
Oswald "Otto" Rocket (voiced by Joseph Ashton): The self-appointed and brazen leader of the gang. Otto is a gifted, intrepid, self-absorbed and highly competitive extreme-sports enthusiast who is dedicated to the pursuit of athletic perfection in the hopes of achieving his ambition of becoming a world-famous athlete and in turn become one of the world's greatest action-sports superstars of all time. While he can be hot-headed and selfish at times, Otto is a kind and loyal person at heart and will always help his friends and family whenever they need it the most.

 Regina "Reggie" Rocket (voiced by Shayna Fox): Otto's tomboyish and sassy older sister. Reggie is an aspiring publisher and author who writes and owns The 'Zine, a blog-type magazine that covers everything from extreme sports to "kid politics." Reggie is also an all-star athlete like her talented brother and while she's no less skillful and competitive as him, she has a calmer disposition and possesses greater maturity than him. Reggie is often the most sensible and sympathetic member of the gang and she also tends to be the voice of reason within the gang.

Maurice "Twister" Rodriguez (voiced by Ulysses Cuadra in Seasons 1–3; Gilbert Leal in Season 4): Otto's best friend and right-hand man. Twister is not exactly known for his intelligence as not only is he somewhat dim-witted and oblivious, but he also has quite the gullibility streak. But despite his lack of intelligence, Twister has proven that he can be quite clever at times, can keep up with Otto and Reggie in sports and has a real knack for videography and art. He hates being called by his real name and is constantly tormented by his older brother and local bully, Lars.

Sam "Squid" Dullard (voiced by Sam Saletta in Season 1; Gary LeRoi Gray in Seasons 2–3; Sean Marquette in Season 4): A Hutchinson, Kansas native and relative newcomer. Sam is nowhere near as athletically gifted as Otto, Reggie and Twister and is usually the most clumsy and timid member of the gang. But what Sam lacks in athletic abilities and self-confidence, he makes up for with his superior intellect, his expert computer programming and electrical engineering skills, and by being an impressive goaltender whenever he plays street hockey.

Ray "Raymundo" Rocket (voiced by John Kassir): Raymundo is Otto and Reggie's widowed strict but loving forty-something father, legendary surfer and is the owner and operator of a combination burger joint and surf shop called the Shore Shack. He drives a 1962 Mercury Woodie wagon and has developed a fear of dogs after watching the movie Attack of the 50 Ft. Poodles back when he was just a kid.

 Tito Makani (voiced by Ray Bumatai): Tito is a retired Hawaiian surfer and self-designed philosopher who not only works side by side with Raymundo to help him run the Shore Shack, but he also provides the gang with helpful advice and valuable life lessons with his own unique brand of wisdom. He usually starts his advice with "Like the ancient Hawaiians say..." Tito has a young nephew named Keoni who occasionally visits Ocean Shores from the Hawaiian Islands to see him.

Secondary Characters 
Lars Rodriguez (voiced by Lombardo Boyar): Lars is Twister's delinquent teenage brother who gives the gang trouble from time to time, bullies Twister on a regular basis and generally spends his free time being up to no good. He is also an extremely competitive athlete and is Otto's biggest competitive and social rival. Even though he makes Twister's life miserable, Lars has shown that he really does care about him deep down and would never want anything seriously bad to happen to him. Lars is often accompanied by his three teenage goons: Pi Piston, Sputz Ringley and Animal.

Eddie Valentine (voiced by Jordon Blake Warkol): The gothic and self-proclaimed "Prince of the Netherworld" is a recurring participant in the gang's activities and a frequent target of Lars' bullying. Eddie's love for all things dark and spooky stems from him being the son of a magician couple. He favors an outfit of a hooded cloak and a "scary" mask.

Oliver Van Rossum (voiced by David Gallagher): Oliver is a rather intelligent kid who at first is Sam's main rival in smarts, but in time becomes a close friend to the gang along with Eddie. He never played sports and was only into academics until he met Sam. In the episode where Oliver met Sam, it was made clear that he would rather watch a documentary of a dung beetle rolling dung balls than participate in physical activity.

Officer Shirley (voiced by CCH Pounder in Season 1; Denise Dowse in Seasons 2–4): A seldom-seen police officer who does what she can in order to try to keep the peace. Not so much the long arm of the law but rather the harsh word of the law as Officer Shirley keeps the kids of Ocean Shores in line with equal amounts of tough talk and niceness. She enjoys a slightly flirtatious friendship with Raymundo to whom she often refers to as "Big Ray."

Trish and Sherry (voiced by Lauren Tom): Reggie's female friends, fellow athletes and surfers, and members of the California All-State Girls' Beach Volleyball Team. They occasionally appear to join in on the gang's activities and have played important roles in several episodes.

Mackenzie Benders (voiced by Rosslynn Taylor-Jordan): A tough five-year-old ankle-biter. She continually beats up the members of "the gang," but has an apparent crush on Twister.

Conroy Blanc (voiced by Obba Babatundé): The park manager of the Madtown Skate Park, who later became Otto and Twister's teacher at their school. In one situation, Conroy was intent on finding the person responsible for ruining a newly-poured cement skate ramp in Madtown. It was Twister who made an imprint in the wet cement by accidentally falling into it face-first; he was attempting to write his initials in it before it set.

Danielle (voiced by Shayna Fox): Otto and Reggie's deceased mother. She apparently died from a tragic surfing accident in Hawaii. Otto and Reggie were very young at the time. This is revealed in Rocket Power: Island of the Menehune.

Merv and Violet Stimpleton (voiced by Henry Gibson and Edie McClurg): The Rockets' next-door neighbors. Merv is apparently retired and tries to live a life of leisure, but becomes easily frustrated with almost everyone, especially with the Rocket gang. Because of this, he has the Madtown Skate Park opened so that the kids can skate without disturbing anyone. Merv is usually depicted as angry and somewhat eccentric (leading in one episode to Otto and Twister thinking him to be a space alien), although he does have a friendly side, particularly towards his wife. Violet is quite the opposite, always smiling and cheerful. Her pride and joy is growing violets in her garden. She is also a prolific cook, though her food is not always edible.

Lieutenant Tice Ryan (voiced by Dale Dye): An Ocean Shores lifeguard who also works as an emergency services coordinator. He is skilled at his jobs and can often be seen with a megaphone barking orders. Lieutenant Tice is shown to be nice and fair, but takes his job very seriously.

Raoul and Sandy Rodriguez (voiced by Carlos Alazraqui and Dyana Ortelli): The mother and father of Twister and Lars Rodriguez and the aunt and uncle of Clio and Scotty.

Paula Dullard (voiced by Jennifer Hale): The mother of Sam Dullard and the ex-wife of Sam's father, Doug Dullard.

Bree "Breezy" Copeley (voiced by Jane Krakowski): A traveling journalist who works for an outdoor adventure/lifestyle magazine, which is not named in the show. Ray has an obvious crush on her and it is implied that there would be a relationship if she wasn't constantly traveling. She only appears in two episodes and is never heard from again.

Doug Dullard (voiced by Gregg Berger): Sam's estranged father who works in the corporate industry. He is rarely seen, as it's implied that he's always working, which clouds his better judgment. He tries to be the "cool dad" by including Sam's friends in their plans, but it ends up with him talking on his cell phone and ignoring Sam. Though he may seem neglectful, he does have good intentions. He almost seems like a stock character, the neglectful parent who cares about their child in the end, which is noted in the episode where he is the main focus; at the end he throws his ringing cellphone into the back seat of the car as a gesture to Sam that he really does care about him.

Keoni Makani (voiced by Matthew Stephen Liu): Tito's young nephew who occasionally visits Ocean Shores from the Hawaiian Islands to spend time with his uncle. He is a good school student and is shown to be as good an athlete as Otto and the gang. 

Clio Rodriguez (voiced by Jamie Maria Cronin): Twister's older cousin who is about Reggie's age. Clio is the exact opposite of Reggie in the sense that she is more "girly." Because she openly imposed on Reggie with her beliefs on how girls should act, Reggie goes on the defense. In the first episode where they meet and interact, Clio and Reggie challenge each other to switch their respective sports and by the end, the girls realize they are not so different from each other and form a strong friendship after Clio proved herself to be a surprisingly good hockey player and Reggie proved herself to be surprisingly good at figure skating.

Episodes

Home media
A VHS tape titled Maxing Out was released in 2001 containing five episodes ("Bruised Man's Curve" • "Super McVarial 900" • "Big Thursday" • "Big Air Dare" • "Otto's Big Break"). In 2004, Nickelodeon released four episodes of the series ("Island of the Menehune" • "Tito's Lucky Shell" • "Welcome to Ottoworld" • "Follow the Leader") on the Island of the Menehune DVD. Other episodes were featured on Nickelodeon compilation DVDs such as Nicktoons Christmas, Nicktoons Halloween and Nickstravaganza! 2.

Nickelodeon and Amazon.com teamed up to release Rocket Power and other Nick shows on manufacture-on-demand DVD-R discs available exclusively through Amazon.com's CreateSpace arm. The Rocket Power manufacture-on-demand DVD-R discs have since been discontinued and made unavailable on Amazon.com as of June 4, 2021.

Broadcast
Rocket Power premiered on Nickelodeon on August 16, 1999, and its final episode (a television movie called "The Big Day") aired on July 30, 2004. Reruns were then aired on the channel until October 7, 2011.

Nicktoons aired the series from 2002 to 2010. Nick GAS also aired the series from 2003 to 2005. The series reran on TeenNick's former block NickRewind (formerly The '90s Are All That, The Splat and NickSplat) from 2014 to 2017.

Other projects
Other projects related to Rocket Power and developed under the aegis of Klasky-Csupo and/or Nickelodeon have included Rocket Power: Beach Bandits, and Maximum Rocket Power Live: The Battle for Madtown Park, a live-action extreme-sports dramatic arena play that briefly toured the U.S. Midwest in spring 2002, before being canceled over low ticket sales (it had originally been scheduled to tour about 40 cities all over the U.S., all the way into fall).

Video games
Several video games based on the series was released on the PlayStation, PlayStation 2, GameCube, Game Boy Color, Game Boy Advance and PC throughout the years, including Rocket Power: Team Rocket Rescue, Rocket Power: Beach Bandits, Rocket Power Gettin' Air, Rocket Power: Dream Scheme, Rocket Power: Zero Gravity Zone and Rocket Power: Extreme Arcade Games.

Soundtrack

The soundtrack album to Rocket Power was released on February 6, 2002. It is officially the soundtrack to the television film Rocket Power: Race Across New Zealand.

Track listing
"Rocket Power Theme Song" by The Wipeouters
"Individuality" by Area-7
"99 Red Balloons" by Goldfinger
"Valentino" by Bowling for Soup
"I'm Cool" by Reel Big Fish

Reception
Common Sense Media give the series a three out of five stars, writing "Parents need to know that watching this show just might inspire future X-games participation. The kids -- never without a skateboard, bike, hockey stick, or surfboard -- perform incredible stunts, seemingly without risk of injury. A boy with less sports ability than the others shows kids that it's OK to need a lot of practice and only take the risks you're personally comfortable with."

See also
Rugrats
Wild Grinders
Kick Buttowski: Suburban Daredevil

References

External links
 
 

 
1990s American animated television series
1990s American children's comedy television series
2000s American animated television series
2000s American children's comedy television series
1999 American television series debuts
2004 American television series endings
1990s Nickelodeon original programming
2000s Nickelodeon original programming
American children's animated action television series
American children's animated adventure television series
American children's animated comedy television series
American children's animated sports television series
English-language television shows
Nicktoons
YTV (Canadian TV channel) original programming
Television series by Klasky Csupo
Animated television series about children
Television shows set in Orange County, California
Skateboarding mass media
Television series created by Gábor Csupó
Television series created by Arlene Klasky
Hawaii in fiction